The Brownstown Formation is a geologic formation in Oklahoma. It preserves fossils dating back to the Cretaceous period.

See also

 List of fossiliferous stratigraphic units in Oklahoma
 Paleontology in Oklahoma

References
 

Cretaceous geology of Oklahoma